Uzbek Canadians are Canadian citizens of Uzbek descent or persons of Uzbek descent residing in Canada. According to the 2016 Census there were 3,920 Canadians who claimed Uzbek ancestry. There is a small group of Uzbeks in the city of Guelph. There are 150 ethnic Uzbek families from Afghanistan. The Uzbeks of Guelph are mainly coming from cities of Andkhoi and Faryab.

Notable Uzbek Canadians
 Artour "Arteezy" Babaev, professional Dota player
 Liane Balaban, actress

See also 

Middle Eastern Canadians
West Asian Canadians

References 

Ethnic groups in Canada
Asian Canadian
Uzbekistani diaspora